The Albatros D.XI was a German single-seat fighter sesquiplane first flown in February 1918. It was the first Albatros fighter to use a rotary engine, in the form of the 120 kW (160 hp) Siemens-Halske Sh.III, and also featured a new wing construction with diagonal struts from the fuselage replacing traditional wire bracing.

Design & development
The wings had unequal spans with the upper planes having greater span than the lower ones, and were braced by I-struts with an aerofoil cross-section, additional rigidity being provided by twinned diagonal struts from the base of these to the top of the fuselage, located where the "landing wires" of a normal wire-braced biplane would be. The use of a rotary engine necessitated a large-diameter propeller and a correspondingly tall undercarriage.

The D.XI was armed with the same twin 7.92 mm (.312 in) Spandau LMG 08/15 machine guns employed on other Albatros fighters. Two prototypes were built, the first having balanced, parallel-chord ailerons and a four-blade propeller; and the second with inversely tapered, unbalanced ailerons and a two-blade propeller. The D.XI was not put into production.

Specifications (D.XI)

References

 
 Das Virtuelle Luftfahrtmuseum

Single-engined tractor aircraft
Sesquiplanes
1910s German fighter aircraft
D.11
Aircraft first flown in 1918